Gunaah is a 1993 Indian Hindi-language film directed by Mahesh Bhatt and produced by Paresh Bagbahara. It stars Sunny Deol and Dimple Kapadia in pivotal roles.

Cast
Sunny Deol as Ravi Sohni
Dimple Kapadia as Kavita Sharma / Kavita Singh / Kavita A. Khanna
Sumeet Saigal as Dr. Ashok Khanna
Soni Razdan as Gloriya
Sujata Mehta as Rita
Raza Murad as Rama Patil
Anang Desai as Rai
Akash Khurana as Mahender Singh
Avtar Gill as Rama's assistant
Mushtaq Khan as Hotel Manager
Anjana Mumtaz as Mrs. Khanna
Kamaldeep as Judge

Soundtrack

References

External links

1990s Hindi-language films
1993 films
Films directed by Mahesh Bhatt
Films scored by Rajesh Roshan